Cark & Cartmel is a railway station on the Furness line, which runs between  and . It is owned by Network Rail and managed by Northern Trains.

History
The station is architecturally interesting, with buildings constructed by the Ulverstone and Lancaster Railway. The station opened on 1 September 1857 as Cark-in-Cartmell. The station was then renamed a number of times, including Cark, Cark and Cartmel and Cark-in-Cartmel, with the current name adopted on 13 May 1984.

The Furness Railway took over the Ulverstone and Lancaster Railway on 21 January 1862. It was later absorbed into the London, Midland and Scottish Railway on 1 January 1923.

The station had a particular importance, as it serves Holker Hall, the home of Lord Cavendish of Furness formerly belonging to the Dukes of Devonshire. Special waiting rooms were provided for the dukes and their guests. The actual building retains many original features and is now a private residence. It extends to approximately one acre of gardens and woodland.

Facilities
The station is unstaffed but has been provided with ticket machines to allow intending travellers to buy tickets prior to travel.  There are shelters and digital information screens on each platform, along with a long-line PA system for train running information provision.  The platforms are linked by a footbridge, but step-free access is also available on each side for disabled travellers.

Service

The station is on the Furness line linking Lancaster and Barrow (though some services extend south to Preston or north east to Carlisle). The station receives a roughly hourly service to Barrow-in-Furness, with a limited number of services continuing to Carlisle via Whitehaven.

There is also a roughly hourly service towards Lancaster, with a limited number of services continuing to Preston. These were formerly operated by First TransPennine Express up until the end of the old Northern and TransPennine franchises on 31 March 2016. Sundays see an hourly service each way (with some longer gaps).

References

External links
 
 
 

Railway stations in Cumbria
DfT Category F2 stations
Former Ulverston and Lancaster Railway stations
Railway stations in Great Britain opened in 1857
Northern franchise railway stations
1857 establishments in England